Yuriy Vladimirovich Andronov (born 6 November 1971 in Samara) is a Russian race walker.

He was disqualified from the 2014 IAAF World Race Walking Cup, having failed a doping test, and was banned from the sport for two years.

International competitions

References

External links
 
 

1971 births
Living people
Sportspeople from Samara, Russia
Russian male racewalkers
Olympic male racewalkers
Olympic athletes of Russia
Athletes (track and field) at the 2004 Summer Olympics
World Athletics Championships athletes for Russia
European Athletics Championships medalists
Russian Athletics Championships winners
Doping cases in athletics
Russian sportspeople in doping cases